The CarbonFix Standard (CFS) was an initiative to certify climate forestation projects to sequester carbon from the atmosphere. The CarbonFix Standard was administered by CarbonFix, a non-profit association based in Germany. In 2012, it was acquired by and integrated into the Gold Standard.

History
The association CarbonFix was founded in 1999. In 2007, the association developed the first version of the CarbonFix Standard, which was presented at the World Climate Conference in Bali, in December 2007.

The standard contained criteria a forestation project had to meet in order to be certified. Sustainable Forest Management was required.

See also
Voluntary Carbon Standard
Carbon Credit
SGS S.A.
Woodland Carbon Code

References

Further reading

 Lopes, P. (2009), Review of Forest Carbon Standards (2009) - Development of a tool for organisations to identify the most appropriate forest carbon credit, Imperial College London, Centre for Environmental Policy.
 Merger, E. (2008), A Comparison of leading Standards in the Voluntary Carbon Market and The State of Climate Forestation Projects, CarbonPositive.

External links 
 https://www.goldstandard.org/

Climate change mitigation